Livoberezhnyi District, formerly known as Ordzhonikidze District, is an urban district of the city of Mariupol, Ukraine.

The district was established in 1939. In 2016 it was renamed to its current name to comply with decommunization laws.

References

Urban districts of Mariupol